Sir Paul Gore, 1st Baronet (1567 – September 1629) was an Anglo-Irish politician, soldier and baronet.

Born in London, he was the eldest son of Gerard Gore and his wife Helen Davenant, daughter of Ralph Davenant. Gore had come to Ireland as a commander of a troop of horse and in 1602, he was despatched to accompany Rory Ó Donnell to a meeting with Queen Elizabeth I of England. He sat as Member of Parliament (MP) in the Irish House of Commons for Ballyshannon from 1613 until 1615. On 2 February 1622, he was created a baronet, of Magherabegg, in the County Donegal.

He married Isabella Wycliffe, daughter of Francis Wycliffe and niece of the 1st Earl of Strafford. They had thirteen children, seven daughters and six sons. Gore was buried at the Abbey Church of Donegal. His eldest son Ralph succeeded to the baronetcy and was an ancestor of the Earl of Ross. His son Arthur was himself created a baronet and was an ancestor of the Irish creation of the Earls of Arran, the Barons Harlech as well as the Irish Barons Annaly. His fourth son Francis was the progenitor of the Gore-Booth Baronets.

References

1567 births
1629 deaths
17th-century Anglo-Irish people
Baronets in the Baronetage of Ireland
Members of the Parliament of Ireland (pre-1801) for County Donegal constituencies
Irish MPs 1613–1615
Politicians from London
16th-century English people
17th-century English people
Paul